Wyoming's 9th State Senate district is one of 30 districts in the Wyoming Senate. It has been represented by Democratic Senator Chris Rothfuss, Rothfuss has been the Senate Minority Leader, since 2013.

List of members representing the district

Recent election results

Federal and statewide results

2006

2010

2014

2018
Democratic Incumbent Chris Rothfuss won the election with no challengers.

References

External links

Wyoming Senate districts